Teratoscincus rustamowi is a small species of gecko, a lizard in the family Sphaerodactylidae. The species is endemic to Uzbekistan.

Description

Reproduction
T. rustamowi is oviparous.

References

Further reading
de Lisle HF, Nazarov RA, Raw LRG, Grathwohl J (2013). Gekkota: a catalogue of recent species. Privately published. 387 pp. (Teratoscincus rustamowi, new status, p. 263).
Szczerbak NN (1979). "[A new subspecies of the Common Wonder Gecko (Teratoscincus scincus rustamovi, ssp. n., Sauria, Reptilia) from Uzbekistan and the taxonomy of the species]". [Protection of Nature of Turkmenistan ] (5): 129-138. ("Teratoscincus scincus rustamovi [sic]", new subspecies). (in Russian).

Teratoscincus
Endemic fauna of Uzbekistan
Reptiles of Central Asia
Reptiles described in 1979